Jamal Norman Whitehead (born 1979) is an American lawyer who is a United States district judge of the United States District Court for the Western District of Washington.

Education 
Whitehead earned a Bachelor of Arts degree in political science from the University of Washington in 2004 and a Juris Doctor from the Seattle University School of Law in 2007.

Career 
From 2007 to 2010, Whitehead worked as an attorney at Garvey Schubert Barer in Seattle. From 2010 to 2014, he served as a senior trial attorney in the Seattle office of the Equal Employment Opportunity Commission. From 2014 to 2016, he served as an Assistant United States Attorney for the Western District of Washington. From 2016 to 2023, he was a shareholder at Schroeter Goldmark & Bender in Seattle. Whitehead is a past president of the Loren Miller Bar Association, Washington's oldest and largest minority bar.

Notable cases 

In 2012, Whitehead represented the Equal Opportunity Commission, when it sued Cottonwood Financial for discriminating against an employee based on his diagnosis of bipolar disorder.  U.S. District Judge Edward F. Shea entered a judgment for $56,500 against Cottonwood Financial due to the company violating the Americans with Disabilities Act (ADA) and the Washington Law Against Discrimination (WLAD) when it fired an employee from its Walla Walla, Washington store.
In 2018, Whitehead served as co-counsel for a disabled car dealership employee after he was fired by Mercedes-Benz of Seattle when he began using a prosthetic voice box to speak. Whitehead tried the case to verdict before a federal jury, which returned a $5 million verdict in his client's favor. At the time, the verdict was the largest in Washington history in a single-plaintiff, disability discrimination case. The car dealership appealed the verdict, and Whitehead successfully argued the case before the Ninth Circuit Court of Appeals. The Court would later affirm the trial court's judgment.
In 2021, Whitehead represented private plaintiffs when they sued a private prison, GEO Group for paying incarcerated ICE detainees $1 a day in its work program. The Court appointed Whitehead as class counsel for over 10,000 detained persons seeking backwages. The state of Washington stated the company must pay detainees the state minimum wage, just as other private corporations doing contract work with the state are required to. After a three week trial, a federal jury returned a verdict of $17.3 million to the class of workers. The case is currently pending on appeal.

Federal judicial service 

On July 13, 2022, President Joe Biden nominated Whitehead to serve as a United States district judge of the United States District Court for the Western District of Washington. President Biden nominated Whitehead to the seat vacated by Judge Richard A. Jones, who assumed senior status on September 5, 2022. On September 21, 2022, a hearing on his nomination was held before the Senate Judiciary Committee. On December 1, 2022, his nomination was reported out of committee by a 12–10 vote. On January 3, 2023, his nomination was returned to the President under Rule XXXI, Paragraph 6 of the United States Senate; he was renominated later the same day. On February 2, 2023, his nomination was reported out of committee by an 11–9 vote. On February 28, 2023, the Senate invoked cloture on his nomination by a 51–43 vote. Later that day, his nomination was confirmed by a 51–43 vote. He received his judicial commission on March 14, 2023.

Personal life 

During her introduction in front of the United States Senate Committee on the Judiciary, senator Patty Murray said that Whitehead is the first judicial nominee by President Joe Biden to have a physical disability (he uses a prosthetic leg).

See also 
 List of African-American federal judges
 List of African-American jurists

References

External links 

1979 births
Living people
21st-century American judges
21st-century American lawyers
African-American judges
African-American lawyers
Assistant United States Attorneys
Judges of the United States District Court for the Western District of Washington
Lawyers from Seattle
People from Washington Township, Gloucester County, New Jersey
Seattle University School of Law alumni
United States district court judges appointed by Joe Biden
University of Washington alumni
Washington (state) lawyers